Buchegg Castle is a castle in the Swiss municipality of Kyburg-Buchegg in the canton of Solothurn, Switzerland.

The castle, built in 1546, has a square tower with a hip roof. The Counts of Buchegg had a castle on the site until 1383 when it was destroyed by the House of Kyburg. The current building saw service as a prison and came into private ownership in 1863. It was restored in 1938 and was converted to a museum in 1956.

See also
 List of castles and fortresses in Switzerland

References

Castles in the canton of Solothurn
Museums in the canton of Solothurn